The Norma Arm is a minor spiral arm of the Milky Way extending from and around its central hub region. The inner portion of the Arm is called the Norma Arm in narrow meaning. The outer end of it is identified either with the Cygnus Arm (not to be confused with local and minor Orion-Cygnus Arm), which lies outside the Perseus Arm, or the Outer Arm, which is located farther away from the center of the Galaxy than the Cygnus Arm. It is named for the Norma constellation, through which the Arm as seen from Earth passes.

Like many other galaxies of similar type, the Milky Way consists of a large mass of stars shaped into the form of a relatively flat disc by gravity. The disc is rotating, with the dense central body of stars moving at greater speeds than those toward the rim of the disc.  As a result, the pattern of stars within the Galaxy as viewed from directly above or below the disc has formed into a spiral.

Because of localised gravitational variations, the spiral pattern has itself formed several distinct 'spiral arms', where particularly large numbers of stars can be found.

See also
Galactic disc

References

Milky Way arms
Galactic astronomy
Spiral galaxies